is a town located in Tōhaku District, Tottori Prefecture, Japan. , the town had an estimated population of 6,056 in 2520 households and a population density of 26 persons per km². The name "Misasa" (literally "three mornings") originates from the belief that one who stays to enjoy three mornings in the town's famous hot springs will find all of his ailments cured.

Geography
Misasa is located in central Tottori Prefecture. It is designated as a heavy snowfall area, and much of the area within the town is mountainous. The Tenjin River flows through the town.

Neighboring  municipalities 
Tottori Prefecture
 Tottori
 Kurayoshi
 Yurihama
Okayama Prefecture
 Kagamino
 Maniwa

Climate
Misasa is classified as a Humid subtropical climate (Köppen Cfa) characterized by warm summers and cold winters with heavy snowfall.  The average annual temperature in Misasa is 13.2 °C. The average annual rainfall is 2097 mm with September as the wettest month. The temperatures are highest on average in August, at around 24.7 °C, and lowest in January, at around 2.4 °C.

Demography
Per Japanese census data, the population of Misasa has been as follows. The population has been declining since the 1960s

History
As with all of Hōki Province, the area was part of the holdings of a branch of the Ikeda clan, daimyō of Tottori Domain under the Edo period Tokugawa shogunate. Following the Meiji restoration, the area was organized into villages within  Tōhaku District, Tottori Prefecture on April 1, 1896 including the village of Misasa. Misasa was raised to town status on November 1,1953.

Government
Misasa has a mayor-council form of government with a directly elected mayor and a unicameral town council of 12 members. Misasa, collectively with the other municipalities of Tōhaku District, contributes three members to the Tottori Prefectural Assembly. In terms of national politics, the town is part of Tottori 1st district of the lower house of the Diet of Japan.

Economy
Misasa is for the most part a spa resort, boasting springs of radium-rich water, exhausting radon, a radioactive gas. Locals believe that bathing one in such waters can be good for one's health, although there is no scientific consensus on whether doing so is detrimental or helpful to one's health (see Radiation hormesis). For this reason, the town of Misasa organizes a yearly Marie Curie festival – Marie Curie discovered radium.

Education
Misasa has one public elementary school and one public junior high schools operated by the town government. The town does not have a high school. The Institute for Planetary Materials Okayama University is located in the town.

Transportation

Railway 
Misasa does not have any passenger railway service. The closest station is Kurayoshi Station on the JR West San'in Main Line.

Highways

Sister city relations
  Lamalou-les-Bains, France, since 1990
  Jōyō, Kyoto, Japan, since 2012

Local attractions
 Misasa Onsen
 A radium-rich hot spring.
 Oshika Valley
 It is named a special location, or "meishou" (名所) by the government, and is about 4 km long.
 Sanbutsu-ji
 A temple located on a cliff on the north face of Mount Mitoku, it is designated as one of the National Treasures of Japan.

In popular culture
The film Koitanibashi was shot in Misasa.

Noted people from Misasa
Eriko Yamaguchi, women's professional shogi player

References

External links

 Official town website 
 Official town website 

Towns in Tottori Prefecture
Tōhaku District, Tottori